Norman S. Endler (May 2, 1931 - May 7, 2003) was a Canadian psychologist and Distinguished Research Professor Emeritus at York University.

References

1931 births
2003 deaths
Academic staff of York University
Canadian psychologists
20th-century Canadian psychologists